Lewis White (2 August 1927 – 1982) was an English footballer who played as a forward in the Football League for Port Vale.

Career
White signed professional forms with Port Vale in October 1948. His only appearance came at outside-right in a 2–1 defeat to Ipswich Town at The Old Recreation Ground on 23 October. He was transferred to Winsford United by manager Gordon Hodgson in July 1949.

Career statistics
Source:

References

Footballers from Stoke-on-Trent
English footballers
Association football forwards
Port Vale F.C. players
Winsford United F.C. players
English Football League players
1927 births
1982 deaths